The Chief Whip of the Conservative Party oversees the whipping system in the party, which is responsible for ensuring that Conservative MPs or members of the House of Lords attend and vote in parliament in the desired way of the party leadership. 
Chief Whips, of which two are appointed in the party, a member of the House of Commons and a member of the House of Lords, also help to organise their party's contribution to parliamentary business. 

The party leadership may allow members to have a free vote based on their own conscience rather than party policy, which means the chief whip is not required to influence the way members vote.

This is a list of people who have served as Chief Whip of the Conservative Party, previously the Tory Party, in the Parliament of the United Kingdom. 

The position is currently held by Simon Hart MP, appointed by Prime Minister Rishi Sunak on 25 October 2022.

House of Commons

House of Lords

In popular culture
Francis Urquhart is a fictional Conservative Chief Whip, created by Michael Dobbs, formerly Chief of Staff for British Conservative Prime Minister Margaret Thatcher. Urquhart was the main character in Dobbs's trilogy of books, that were turned into successful BBC television dramas in the 1990s. The first book in the trilogy, House of Cards, was adapted and broadcast by the BBC in 1990. This was subsequently followed by a 1993 adaptation of the second element of the trilogy, To Play The King. The third part  The Final Cut, aired in 1995. The trilogy charts Urquhart's ambitious rise through his party's ranks until he becomes Prime Minister. Urquhart was played by Ian Richardson.

See also

Chief Whip of the Labour Party
Chief Whip of the Liberal Democrats

References

Sources
Chris Cook and Brendan Keith, British Historical Facts 1830-1900, Macmillan, 1975, pp. 92–93.
David Butler and Gareth Butler, Twentieth-Century British Historical Facts 1900-2000, Macmillan, 2000.

Conservative Party (UK)-related lists
Political whips